Perth is the capital of Western Australia.

Perth also commonly refers to Perth, Scotland, a city and the administrative centre of the Perth and Kinross council area.

Perth may also refer to:

Places

Australia
 Perth, Tasmania, a small town in Tasmania
 Perth Basin, a sedimentary basin in Western Australia
 Perth (suburb), the suburb in which the main central business district of Western Australia's capital city is located
 City of Perth, a local government area of Western Australia
 Division of Perth, a Western Australian seat in the Australian House of Representatives
 Electoral district of Perth, a seat in the Western Australian Legislative Assembly
 Greater Perth, a Western Australian statistical area
 Perth County, Western Australia, a former cadastral unit of Western Australia
 Perth Metropolitan Region, a Western Australian urban planning region
 Western Australian Herbarium (Index Herbariorum code PERTH)

Canada
 Perth Parish, New Brunswick
 Perth-Andover, New Brunswick, a village
 Perth, Ontario, a town in Lanark County in eastern Ontario
 Perth County, Ontario, a county in southwestern Ontario
 Perth (electoral district), a former federal electoral district in Ontario

New Zealand
 Perth River, a river in New Zealand

Scotland
 County of Perth, or Perthshire, a registration county, and formerly a local government county, from 1890 to 1975
 Perth (Scottish Parliament constituency), a Scottish Parliament constituency from 1999 to the present
 Perth (UK Parliament constituency), a Parliament of the United Kingdom constituency from 1832 to 1950 and again from 1997 to 2005

United States
 Perth, New York, town
 North Dakota:
 Perth, North Dakota, city 
 Perth Township, Walsh County, North Dakota
 Unincorporated places:
 Perth, Delaware
 Perth, Indiana
 Perth, Kansas
 Perth, Minnesota

Titles of Nobility 

 Duke of Perth, in Jacobite peerage
 Earl of Perth, in Scottish peerage

Military
 Blackburn Perth,  British long-range military flying boat
 The Perth Regiment, former regiment of the Canadian Army
 Australian Navy:
 , modified Leander-class light cruiser sunk during the Battle of Sunda Strait
 , an Anzac-class frigate commissioned in 2006
 , Perth-class guided missile destroyers commissioned in 1965
 , class of warship used by the Royal Australian Navy

Other uses
 3953 Perth, asteroid
 MV Perth, oldest surviving wooden boat in Western Australia
 Perth (HM Prison), prison in Scotland
 Perth (film), 2004 Singaporean film
 Tanapon Sukumpantanasan, Thai actor also known as Perth
 "Perth", a song by Bon Iver, from Bon Iver, Bon Iver
 "Perth", a song by Beirut, from No No No (Beirut album)

See also
 Perth—Middlesex, a former federal and provincial electoral district in Ontario
 Perth—Wellington, a federal electoral district in Ontario
 Perth—Wellington (provincial electoral district), a provincial electoral district in Ontario
 Perth—Wellington—Waterloo, a former federal electoral district in Ontario
 Perth and Kinross, a unitary council area from 1996 to the present
 Perth and Kinross (UK Parliament constituency), a Parliament of the United Kingdom constituency from 1983 to 1997
 Perth Burghs (UK Parliament constituency), a Parliament of the United Kingdom constituency from 1708 to 1832
 Perth Amboy, New Jersey, a city in New Jersey, U.S.